Joan Riley (born 26 May 1958) is a Jamaican-British writer. Her 1985 debut novel The Unbelonging made her "the first Afro-Caribbean woman author to write about the experiences of Blacks in England".

Biography
Joan Riley was born in Hopewell, Richmond, St. Mary, Jamaica, the youngest of eight children (six girls and two boys), and was raised by her father after her mother died in childbirth. She received her early education on that island before migrating in 1976 to the United Kingdom. There she studied social work at the University of Sussex and the University of London. She has worked at a drugs advisory agency and wrote about the experiences of Caribbean women.

Riley is the author of four novels; her first, The Unbelonging, published in 1985, is considered the first by a woman about the black experience in Britain. Riley was awarded the Voice award for her work in 1992, and the MIND prize in 1993 for A Kindness to the Children.

She has been featured in such anthologies as Daughters of Africa (edited by Margaret Busby, 1992) and Her True-True Name (edited by Pamela Mordecai, 1989). Riley co-edited with Briar Wood Leave to Stay: Stories of Exile and Belonging (Virago, 1996), a collection of fiction and poetry by writers from India, the Caribbean, China, South Africa, the USSR, Canada, Australia and Pakistan, including Sujata Bhatt, Fred D'Aguiar, Michael Donaghy, Jane Duran, Michael Hoffman, Aamer Hussein, Mimi Khalvati, Adam Lively, Sindiwe Magona, Bharati Mukherjee, Hanan al-Shaykh, Janice Shinebourne and Zinovy Zinik.

Bibliography
Novels
 The Unbelonging (London: The Women's Press, 1985)
 Waiting in the Twilight (London: The Women's Press, 1987)
 Romance (London: The Women's Press, 1988; new edition 1997)
 A Kindness to the Children (London: The Women's Press, 1992)

Further reading 
 Beyer, Charlotte. "Representations of Ageing and Black British Identity in Andrea Levy's Every Light in the House Burnin''' and Joan Riley's Waiting in the Twilight". Andrea Levy, spec. issue of Entertext 9, 2012, pp. 105–121.
 Corhay-Ledent, Bénédicte. “Between Conflicting Worlds: Female Exiles in Jean Rhys's Voyage in the Dark and Joan Riley's The Unbelonging", Crisis and Creativity in the New Literatures in English, edited by Geoffry Davis, Rodopi, 1990, pp. 499–510.
 Ellis, David, "'Wives and Workers': The Novels of Joan Riley", in Emma Parker (ed.), Contemporary British Women Writers, Volume 57, Cambridge: D. S. Brewer, 2004, pp. 68–84.
 Fischer, Susan Alice. "Women Writers, Global Migration, and the City: Joan Riley's Waiting in the Twilight and Hanan Al-Shaykh's Only in London", Tulsa Studies in Women's Literature, vol. 23, no. 1, 2004, 107–120.
 Hong, Fang, "Joan Riley and the Unbelonging Black Migrant Woman", Institute of Foreign Languages, Soochow University, Foreign Literature 2008-5.
 "Joan Riley talks with Aamer Hussein", Wasafiri'', 8:17, 1993, 17–19, DOI: 10.1080/02690059308574300.

References

External links
 Joan Riley by Donald MacLellan, National Portrait Gallery, London
 "Joan Riley", Black British Women Writers.

1958 births
20th-century English novelists
20th-century English women writers
20th-century Jamaican novelists
Alumni of the University of London
Alumni of the University of Sussex
Black British women writers
English women novelists
Jamaican emigrants to the United Kingdom
Living people
People from Saint Mary Parish, Jamaica
Jamaican women novelists